Cincinnatus Honorary Society (Cincinnatus) is a co-ed honorary society at the University of Cincinnati. It is the oldest co-ed honorary organization at the university.

History
Founded in 1917, it was originally founded to recognize spirited seniors as a predecessor to an alumni association. After lapsing from 1937 to the end of World War II, the organization was resurrected as a recruitment oriented organization in the 1950s. Members of Cincinnatus would participate in summer events for incoming freshmen to UC, assist in orientation, and facilitate events on behalf of the alumni association. Today, the organization recognizes students who have shown dedication to recruitment and retention of students at the university. As the name suggests, the organization is named after Cincinnatus, a Roman general who is also the namesake for the city of Cincinnati.

Nearly Naked Mile
The organization also has sponsored an annual run for the benefit of the Society of Saint Vincent de Paul in Cincinnati since 2007. Participants run a one-mile course around the campus, "nearly naked" during homecoming week to raise money to cloth the underprivileged.

Notable members
Louise Nippert (1934), philanthropist and owner of the Cincinnati Reds
Myron Ullman (1967), former chairman and CEO of J. C. Penney, current chairman of Starbucks Corporation
Peter Woo (1968), Hong Kong billionaire businessman
Brad Wenstrup (1979), politician, U.S. Representative for

References

Collegiate secret societies
Honor societies
Student societies in the United States
University of Cincinnati
Student organizations established in 1917
1917 establishments in Ohio